Wally Bridgman (2 April 1931 – 17 November 1996) was a New Zealand cricketer. He played in two first-class matches for Canterbury in 1954/55.

See also
 List of Canterbury representative cricketers

References

External links
 

1931 births
1996 deaths
New Zealand cricketers
Canterbury cricketers
Cricketers from Invercargill